Molinos is a municipality located in the Maestrazgo comarca, province of Teruel, Aragon, Spain. According to the 2010 census the municipality has a population of 303 inhabitants.

The impressive Grutas de Cristal "glass caves" are located within Molinos municipal term.

Gallery

See also
Maestrazgo, Aragon
List of municipalities in Teruel

References

External links 

Página Oficial de MOLINOS - TERUEL
Peña Pitorreo - Molinos - Teruel
MOLINOS - TERUEL
CAI Aragón-Molinos
Molinos - Teruel

Municipalities in the Province of Teruel
Maestrazgo